Kremasti is a village in Laconia, southern Greece. Located in the Parnon mountain range, it is 860 m above sea level. It is part of the municipal unit of Niata.

Kremasti's name derives from the Greek word "kremasto," which translates to "hung" or "suspended," since the village looks as if it is suspended from the surrounding mountains.

References

External links
www.kremasti.gr
Kremasti on 'Menoume Ellada' (part 1 of 2) - video
Kremasti on 'Menoume Ellada' (part 2 of 2) - video

Populated places in Laconia